Laurence Arthur Rickels (born December 2, 1954) is an American literary and media theorist, whose most significant works have been in the tradition of the Frankfurt School's efforts to apply psychoanalytic insights to mass media culture.  Some of his best known works include The Case of California, The Vampire Lectures, and the three volume work Nazi Psychoanalysis.  After 30 years at the University of California at Santa Barbara, he was appointed successor to Klaus Theweleit in April 2011 to the Academy of Fine Arts, Karlsruhe, where he was professor of Art and Theory for six years. During spring semester 2018 Rickels held the Eberhard Berent Goethe Chair at New York University.  In the summers, he serves as the Sigmund Freud Professor of Media and Philosophy at the European Graduate School in Saas-Fee, Switzerland.

Biography
Rickels was born in Cherokee, Iowa on December 2, 1954. He currently resides and works in Palm Springs and Berlin.

Academic life

Rickels’s research has been supported by the Alexander von Humboldt Foundation, the Austrian Government, the Center for German and European Studies (UC Berkeley), the German Academic Exchange Service (DAAD), the Interdisciplinary Humanities Center (UC Santa Barbara), and the Zentrum für Literatur und Kulturforschung Berlin, among other institutions, agencies, and offices. At New York University he presented the 2007 Otto and Ilse Mainzer Lecture.

Published books
(book written as author) 

 Der Integrierte Vampir und was damit zusammenhängt (Vienna Passagen Verlag, 2017) 
 The Psycho Records (New York Wallflower/Columbia University Press, 2016) 
 Germany A Science Fiction (Fort Wayne AntiOedipus Press, 2015)	
 Die Unterwelt der Psychoanalyse (Vienna Passagen Verlag, 2014)	
 SPECTRE (Fort Wayne AntiOedipus Press, 2013)	
 Geprüfte Seelen (Vienna Passagen Verlag, 2012)	
 I Think I Am Philip K. Dick (Minneapolis University of Minnesota Press, 2010)
 뱀파이어 강의 (Seoul Rubybox Publisher, 2009)
 The Devil Notebooks (Minneapolis University of Minnesota Press, 2008)
 Ulrike Ottinger The Autobiography of Art Cinema (Minneapolis University of Minnesota Press, 2008)
 Ulrike Ottinger. Eine Autobiografie des Kinos (Berlin b_books, 2007)
 Vampirismus Vorlesungen (Berlin Brinkmann & Bose, 2007)
 Nazi Psychoanalysis, 3 Volumes Only Psychoanalysis Won the War, CryptoFetishism, PsyFi (Minneapolis University of Minnesota Press, 2002)
 The Vampire Lectures (Minneapolis University of Minnesota Press, 1999)
 The Case of California (Baltimore The Johns Hopkins University Press, 1991) *Reprinted with University of Minnesota Press, 2001.	
 Der unbetrauerbare Tod (Vienna Edition Passagen, 1989)
 Aberrations of Mourning Writing on German Crypts (Detroit Wayne State University Press, 1988)

See also
List of psychoanalytical theorists

References

External links
  Laurence A. Rickels] Profile at European Graduate School, Department of Media & Communications
  Profile by UCSB Department of Germanic, Slavic and Semitic Studies] 
  Profile by the Fine Arts Academy of Karlsruhe

Living people
American psychotherapists
American literary theorists
University of California, Santa Barbara faculty
Academic staff of European Graduate School
1954 births
People from Cherokee, Iowa